Kninska Krajina ("Knin Krajina") is a geographical and historical region in Croatia, part of the larger Zagora (hinterland) region. It is located around the town of Knin.

Geography

Kninska Krajina is situated between Bukovica in the southwest, Lika in the northwest, Drniška krajina (in Zagora) in the south, Cetinska krajina in the southwest, and (Završje) Bosnia and Herzegovina in the east.

History

Middle Ages
In the 6th century, the region was settled by Slavs (Sklavenoi). Knin itself was first mentioned by Byzantine Emperor Constantine Porphyrogenitus (r. 913–959) as the centre of a parish under Croatian rule. At the request of King Peter Krešimir IV of Croatia (r. 1058–1075), Knin became an episcopal see and the bishop of Knin held a title bishop of Croats (episcopus Chroatorum). Demetrius Zvonimir of Croatia (r. 1075–1089) was seated in the town.
There are remains of Serbian churches and monasteries in this region dating from 15th century. This suggest that Serb people lived here for several centuries. 

In the 15th century, the Ottoman Empire occupied the area resulting in most of the native population fleeing the region. It was largely abandoned and devastated as the Ottoman army advanced towards the north and west. The region was administrated into the Sanjak of Kirka.

Modern period
By the 17th and 18th centuries, the Austrian Empire managed to thwart the Ottoman advances; meanwhile, the area had been slowly repopulated by Eastern Orthodox Christian Serbs since at least the 15th century. These Serbs had fled the Ottomans and were given lands in exchange for military service in the so-called Military Frontier (the Austro-Hungarian-Ottoman buffer zone).

In 1990, the Serbian autonomous region known as SAO Kninska Krajina was established with a local government, named after this geographical region. This region, along with other Serb-inhabited autonomous regions were merged to form the Republic of Serbian Krajina which sought to remain in union with Serbia and Montenegro upon Croatia's proclamation of independence in 1991. The area was ethnically cleansed of non-Serbs. In 1995, the Croatian army retook the region in Operation Storm, and the majority of the Serb population fled or was displaced. Today, the region is sparsely populated due to few economic opportunities.

See also
Geography of Croatia

References

Dr Jovan Plavša, Stanovništvo Kninske Krajine, Novi Sad, 1997.

Regions of Croatia
Dalmatia
Šibenik-Knin County